Trevor Collins (born 9 July 1929) was a South African cricketer. He played in six first-class matches for Border in 1946/47 and 1947/48.

See also
 List of Border representative cricketers

References

External links
 

1929 births
Possibly living people
South African cricketers
Border cricketers
People from Queenstown, South Africa
Cricketers from the Eastern Cape